Patricia Wenjie Cheng (born 1952) is a Chinese American psychologist. She is a leading researcher in cognitive psychology who works on human reasoning. She is best known for her psychological work on human understanding of causality. Her "power theory of the probabilistic contrast model," or power PC theory  (1997) posits that people filter observations of events through a basic belief that causes have the power to generate (or prevent) their effects, thereby inferring specific cause-effect relations.

Biography
Cheng was born in Hong Kong in 1952. She received her B.A. from Barnard College, and her PhD in Psychology from the University of Michigan in 1980. She then taught at the Chinese University of Hong Kong. After post-doctoral training in the Department of Computer Science at Carnegie-Mellon University, she joined the faculty of the University of California, Los Angeles in 1986, where she is now a Professor of Psychology. Cheng received a fellowship from the John Simon Guggenheim Memorial Foundation in 2000. She is also a Fellow of the Association for Psychological Science.

Selected works

See also 

 Causal reasoning

References

External links 
Patricia Cheng's UCLA home page
Patricia Cheng's Research Lab

1952 births
Living people
American women psychologists
University of California, Los Angeles faculty
University of Michigan alumni
Barnard College alumni
American people of Chinese descent
21st-century American women
American cognitive psychologists